Dion Kacuri (born 11 February 2004) is a Swiss professional footballer who plays as a midfielder for Grasshopper Club Zürich in the Swiss Super League.

Professional career
He made his professional debut for Grasshopper in a 3-1 Swiss Super League win over FC Sion on 31 October 2021. He signed a professional contract with Grasshopper on 12 January 2022, keeping him at the club until 2025. On 4 September 2022, he was nominated in the starting lineup for the first time and also shot his first goal in an official match, the opening goal in a 3-0 victory over FC Winterthur.

Personal life
Born in Switzerland, Kacuri is of Kosovan descent.

References

External links
 
 SFL Profile

2004 births
Living people
People from Baden, Switzerland
Swiss men's footballers
Swiss people of Kosovan descent
Grasshopper Club Zürich players
Swiss Super League players
Association football midfielders
Sportspeople from Aargau